Jason Freese is an American musician and multi-instrumentalist. As a professional studio musician he has performed on over 50 albums, including for artists Green Day, Dr. Dre, Pitbull, Avenged Sevenfold, Goo Goo Dolls, and Jewel. He is the son of tuba soloist Stan Freese and the younger brother of professional drummer Josh Freese.

Jason has performed as a studio musician and touring member in Green Day since 2004. He has performed on their American Idiot World Tour,  21st Century Breakdown World Tour, 99 Revolutions Tour, Revolution Radio Tour, and Hella Mega Tour and appeared on their live albums Bullet in a Bible and Awesome as Fuck. His performing credits most often consist of saxophone, piano, and keyboards. His credits as a producer include Jewel's 2009 album Lullaby and Death by Stereo's 2009 album Death Is My Only Friend.

He is based in Fullerton, California.

Discography

References

External links 
 

1975 births
Living people
Musicians from Fullerton, California